John Warren Steber, III (September 12, 1923 – October 1, 1975) was an American football guard in the National Football League for the Washington Redskins.  He played college football for the Vanderbilt Commodores and the Georgia Tech Yellow Jackets.  He was drafted in the seventh round (61st overall) of the 1945 NFL Draft.

External links

1923 births
1975 deaths
American football offensive guards
Burials in Alabama
Georgia Tech Yellow Jackets football players
Players of American football from Alabama
Sportspeople from Mobile, Alabama
Vanderbilt Commodores football players
Washington Redskins players